Stage Door Johnnies is the third album by English singer-songwriter Claire Hamill, released in 1974.

Track listing 
All tracks composed by Claire Hamill; except where indicated
 "We Gotta Get out of This Place" (Barry Mann, Cynthia Weil) - 3:18
 "Oh Daddy (Blues) (You Don't Have No Mamma at All)" (Ed Herbert, William Russell) - 3:42
 "All the Cakes She Baked Him" - 3:20
 "Trying to Work It Out" - 3:32
 "Geronimo's Cadillac" (Michael Martin Murphey, Charles John Quatro) - 4:24
 "Something to Believe In" (Steve Miller) - 4:08
 "You Know How Ladies Are" - 2:44
 "You Take My Breath Away" - 2:36
 "Go Now" (Larry Banks, Milton Bennett) - 3:32
 "Luck of the Draw" - 3:12
 "Stage Door Johnnies" - 2:04

Personnel 
Claire Hamill - guitar, keyboards, vocals
Phil Palmer - lead electric guitar
Roy Neve - guitar
Nick South, Paul Westwood, Phil Chen - bass
Dave Rowberry - keyboards
Clem Cattini, Jim Frank, Neil McBain - drums
 Laurie Brown - trumpet
 Ray Davies - producer, backing vocals
 Diz Disley - guitar on "Oh Daddy"
 Tim Hinkley - keyboards on "Stage Door Johnnies"
 Alan Holmes - flute
 Lew Warburton - string arrangements
Technical
 Roger Beale - engineer

References

External links
Claire Hamill's website

Claire Hamill albums
1974 albums
Albums produced by Ray Davies